Las Costas is a village and rural municipality in Salta Province in northwestern Argentina.

Climate

References

Populated places in Salta Province